Richard X Presents His X-Factor Vol. 1 is the debut compilation album by British pop producer Richard X. The album features 15 tracks all produced by Richard X, most of which feature guest vocals.

Track listing
 "Start" (Richard X)
 "Being Nobody" (Richard X vs Liberty X)
 "Rock Jacket" (Richard X)
 "You Used To" (Richard X featuring Javine)
 "Just Friends" (Richard X featuring Annie)
 "IX" (Richard X)
 "Lonely" (Richard X featuring Caron Wheeler)
 "Walk on By" (Richard X featuring Deborah Evans-Strickland)
 "Lemon/Lime" (Richard X featuring Deborah Evans-Strickland)
 "Finest Dreams" (Richard X featuring Kelis)
 "You (Better Let Me Love You X4) Tonight" (Richard X featuring Tiga)
 "Mark One" (Richard X featuring Mark Goodier)
 "Freak like Me" (We Don't Give a Damn Mix) (Sugababes)
 "Into U" (Richard X featuring Jarvis Cocker and Hope Sandoval)
 "End" (Richard X)

Bonus tracks
Two bonus tracks featured on the US edition of the album released by Astralwerks.
"Being Nobody" (Richard X Remix)
"Finest Dreams" (Part 2)

Note

"You Used To" was supposed to be the fourth single off the album but was cancelled. A promo single was sent out and a music video was commissioned.

References

External links
Album Press Release at Black Melody (Richard X's Official Site)
Astralwerks Site for the Album (Certain links no longer work)

Albums produced by Richard X
2003 compilation albums